St. Philip's College may refer to:

 St. Philip's Christian College (New South Wales, Australia), an independent co-educational Christian school
 St. Philip's College (Northern Territory, Australia), a private, coeducational  boarding school
 St. Philip's College (United States), a community college in San Antonio, Texas